Ryan Weathers (born December 17, 1999) is an American professional baseball pitcher for the San Diego Padres of Major League Baseball (MLB). He made his MLB debut in 2020.

Amateur career
Weathers attended Loretto High School in Loretto, Tennessee. As a junior in 2017, he went 8–0 with an 0.14 earned run average (ERA) and 111 strikeouts in 49 innings. He also hit .475 with five home runs and 29 runs batted in (RBI). As a senior in 2018, Weathers was the Gatorade National Baseball Player of the Year after going 11–0 with a 0.09 ERA and 148 strikeouts in 76 innings. Weathers committed to Vanderbilt University to play college baseball.

Professional career
Considered one of the top prospects for the 2018 Major League Baseball draft, he was drafted 7th overall by the San Diego Padres. He signed with the Padres on July 1, 2018, receiving a $5,226,500 signing bonus. He made his professional debut with the Arizona League Padres and was promoted to the Fort Wayne TinCaps in August. In seven starts between the two clubs, Weathers was 0-3 with a 3.44 ERA.

Weathers returned to the TinCaps for the 2019 season, earning Midwest League All-Star honors. Over 22 starts, he pitched to a 3-7 record with a 3.84 ERA over 96 innings, striking out ninety.

On October 6, 2020, Weathers made his major league debut during Game 1 of the 2020 NLDS. He is the second pitcher and sixth player in MLB history to make his debut in the postseason, following Shane McClanahan, Alex Kirilloff, Adalberto Mondesi, Mark Kiger, and Bug Holliday.

Weathers made the Padres' 2021 Opening Day roster out of spring training. On April 16, 2021, he made his first career MLB start against the Los Angeles Dodgers. On July 24, Weathers hit his first career home run, a solo shot off Miami Marlins starter Braxton Garrett. He finished the 2021 season with a 4–7 record and pitched to a 5.32 ERA in 30 games (18 starts).

Personal
Weathers is the son of former Major League Baseball (MLB) player, David Weathers.

Weathers became engaged to Thayer Hall on January 23, 2022. The two were married on November 6, 2022.

References

External links

1999 births
Living people
People from Lawrence County, Tennessee
Baseball players from Tennessee
Major League Baseball pitchers
San Diego Padres players
Arizona League Padres players
Fort Wayne TinCaps players